Gauffin is a Swedish and Finnish surname. Notable people with the surname include:

 Emy Gauffin (1928–1993), Swedish orienteering competitor
 Thorsten Gauffin (1901–1970), Finnish chess player

Swedish-language surnames
Finnish-language surnames